Sparattosperma is a genus of flowering plants belonging to the family Bignoniaceae.

Its native range is Southern Tropical America.

Species:
 Sparattosperma catingae A.H.Gentry 
 Sparattosperma leucanthum (Vell.) K.Schum.

References

Bignoniaceae
Bignoniaceae genera